The Pittsburgh Pirates are a Major League Baseball (MLB) franchise based in Pittsburgh, Pennsylvania. They play in the National League Central division. Originally known as the Alleghenys, they played in the American Association from 1882 through 1886, and have played in the National League since 1887. The first game of the new baseball season for a team is played on Opening Day, and being named the Opening Day starter is an honor, which is often given to the player who is expected to lead the pitching staff that season, though there are various strategic reasons why a team's best pitcher might not start on Opening Day. The Pirates have used 71 Opening Day starting pitchers since they began to play as a Major League team in 1882. The Pirates have a record of 69 wins and 60 losses in their Opening Day games.

The Pirates have played in several different home ball parks.  Between 1882 and 1909 they played in two parks called Exposition Park and in Recreation Park. They played in Forbes Field from 1909 to 1970 and Three Rivers Stadium from 1970 to 2000 and they have played in their current stadium, PNC Park, since 2001. They had a record of no wins and one loss in the first Exposition Park, four wins and no losses in Recreation Park and no wins and two losses in the second Exposition Park. They had a record of four wins and two losses at Forbes Field and a record of five wins and eight losses at Three Rivers Stadium. Through 2010, they have a record of two wins and one loss at PNC Park. That gives the Pirates an overall Opening Day record of 15 wins and 14 losses at home. They have a record of 54 wins and 46 losses in Opening Day games on the road.

Bob Friend has made the most Opening Day starts for the Pirates, with seven.  Babe Adams and Frank Killen each made five Opening Day starts for the Pirates, and Deacon Phillippe, Howie Camnitz, Cy Blanton and Bob Veale each made four Opening Day starts. Ed Morris, Pud Galvin, Wilbur Cooper, Ray Kremer, Rip Sewell, Steve Blass, Dock Ellis, Rick Rhoden, Doug Drabek and Francisco Liriano all made three Opening Day starts for the Pirates. Several Pittsburgh Pirates Opening Day starting pitchers have been elected to the Baseball Hall of Fame, including Galvin, Burleigh Grimes, Waite Hoyt, Jim Bunning, and Bert Blyleven. Bunning was elected as both a United States congressman and senator from Kentucky after retiring from baseball.

The Pirates have won nine National League titles, in 1901, 1902, 1903, 1909, 1925, 1927, 1960, 1971 and 1979. They went on to win the World Series in 1909, 1925, 1960, 1971 and 1979 (the modern World Series began in 1903). Sam Leever was the Pirates Opening Day starting pitcher in 1901, Phillippe was the Opening Day starting pitcher in both 1902 and 1903, Camnitz was the Opening Day starting pitcher in 1909, Emil Yde in 1925, Kremer in 1927, Friend in 1960, Ellis in 1971 and Blyleven in 1979.

Key

Pitchers

References

External links
Pittsburgh Pirates Opening Day Starters and Results – Baseball-Reference.com

Opening day starters
Lists of Major League Baseball Opening Day starting pitchers